The Stemnic is a right tributary of the river Bârlad in Romania. It discharges into the Bârlad near Bălteni.

References

Rivers of Romania
Rivers of Vaslui County